

Episodes

Season 12 (2010)

Season 13 (2011)

Season 14 (2012)

Season 15 (2013)

Season 16 (2014)

Season 17 (2015)

Season 18 (2016)

Over the Top (2016)

Season 19 (2017)

Season 20 (2018)

Season 21 (2019)

References

 
Lists of American reality television series episodes